KITY (102.9 FM) is a radio station broadcasting an oldies format. Licensed to Llano, Texas, United States, which serves the entire Highland Lakes area: Marble Falls, Burnet, Kingsland, Horseshoe Bay, Granite Shoals, Cottonwood Shores and Llano.  The station is currently owned by Bryan A. King.  KITY 102.9 features news every hour from NBC Radio. KITY is also heard on 106.1 in Burnet, Texas.

The station's format is "oldies." The station operates 24/7. The call letters KITY were originally used by another FM station in Texas.

KITY also previously broadcast the oldies format on their sister station KOTY in Mason, Texas, serving Mason, Junction and Harper. KOTY's license was cancelled by the Federal Communications Commission on March 12, 2018, due to having been silent or operating from unauthorized facilities since August 11, 2017.

References

External links

ITY